Dactylia is a genus of demosponges in the family Callyspongiidae.

Species  
 Dactylia australis (Lendenfeld, 1889)
 Dactylia candelabrum (Lendenfeld, 1889)
 Dactylia carteri Van Soest & Hooper, 2020
 Dactylia ceratosa (Dendy, 1887)
 Dactylia clavata (Lendenfeld, 1889)
 Dactylia crispata (Lamarck, 1814)
 Dactylia dichotoma (Lendenfeld, 1886)
 Dactylia elegans (Lendenfeld, 1888)
 Dactylia illawarra (Lendenfeld, 1889)
 Dactylia imitans (Lendenfeld, 1886)
 Dactylia impar Carter, 1885
 Dactylia radix (Lendenfeld, 1888)
 Dactylia repens (Carter, 1886)
 Dactylia syphonoides (Lamarck, 1814)
 Dactylia varia (Gray, 1843)

References 

Sponge genera
Callyspongiidae
Taxa named by Henry John Carter